West Virginia Route 32 is a north–south state highway connecting Randolph County and Tucker County in the northeastern portion of the U.S. state of West Virginia. The southern terminus is at U.S. Route 33 and West Virginia Route 55 in Harman. The northern terminus is at U.S. Route 219 in Thomas. The highway was originally numbered WV 40.

Major intersections

References

032
Transportation in Randolph County, West Virginia
Transportation in Tucker County, West Virginia